State Road 119 exists as two separate roads in the U.S. state of Indiana. The road is a rural surface highway for the entire length of both sections.

Route description

Southern section

Its southern terminus is in Buffalo in White County, at the intersection of State Road 16 and State Road 39. The roads runs east from there and is concurrent with SR 16 until that road goes south, whereas SR 119 goes north. It continues in a generally northern direction passing through Headlee, until it terminates at U.S. Route 35 in Winamac in Pulaski County.

Northern section

The southern terminus is at State Road 19 just south of Wakarusa. The road continues northeast passing through Southwest. Just west of Goshen SR 119 turns due east toward State Road 15 in Goshen. In Goshen SR 119 is concurrent with Plymouth Ave.

History 
SR 119 went as far south as Monticello, now that route is part of State Road 39.

The first path along part of the modern SR 119 roadway was the Plymouth-Goshen Trail. The trail was founded on October 19, 1835, to connect the county seats of Marshall County, Plymouth, and Elkhart County, Goshen. At this time counties built trails to connect county seats with other county seats. Surveyors places wooden posted at one mile interval along the route and documented the entire path. In February 1851, the Plymouth Goshen Plank Road Company was founded and begin converting the trail to a plank road. The company placed toll barriers every six miles along the entire length of the road. On March 18, 1932, the section of road between SR 19 and SR 15 became a state highway and the remaining sections of the trail remained as county roads or city streets. SR 119 was formed to connect SR 19 with SR 15 and the city of Goshen.

Major intersections

References

External links

119
Transportation in Elkhart County, Indiana
Transportation in Pulaski County, Indiana
Transportation in White County, Indiana